Tommaso Brancaccio (1621 – 29 April 1677) was a Roman Catholic prelate who served as Bishop of Nardò (1669–1677) and Bishop of Avellino e Frigento (1656–1669).

Biography
Tommaso Brancaccio was born in Ugento, Italy in 1621. On 16 October 1656, he was appointed during the papacy of Pope Alexander VII as Bishop of Avellino e Frigento. On 19 August 1669, he was appointed during the papacy of Pope Clement IX as Bishop of Nardò. He served as Bishop of Avellino e Frigento until his death on 29 April 1677.

While bishop, he was the principal co-consecrator of Giuseppe Petagna, Bishop of Caiazzo (1657).

See also
Catholic Church in Italy

References

External links and additional sources
 (for Chronology of Bishops) 
 (for Chronology of Bishops) 
 (for Chronology of Bishops) 
(for Chronology of Bishops) 

17th-century Italian Roman Catholic bishops
1621 births
1677 deaths
Bishops appointed by Pope Alexander VII
Bishops appointed by Pope Clement IX